Cockerham is a civil parish in Lancaster, Lancashire, England. It contains 19 listed buildings that are recorded in the National Heritage List for England. Of these, two are listed at Grade II*, the middle grade, and the others are at Grade II.  Apart from the village of Cockerham, the parish is rural, and most of the listed buildings are houses, cottages, farmhouses and farm buildings.  The other listed buildings include a church, the base of a sundial, boundary stones, and a bridge.

Key

Buildings

References

Citations

Sources

Lists of listed buildings in Lancashire
Buildings and structures in the City of Lancaster